William George Howard Gritten FRGS (7 February 1870 – 5 April 1943), also known as W. G. Howard Gritten, was a barrister and writer, and a British Conservative politician, who was elected a Member of Parliament for The Hartlepools in 1918, until 1922, and re-elected in 1929 until his death in 1943.

Born in Westminster, London, on 7 Feb 1870, Gritten was the only son of William Gritten (an architect) and his wife Annie Howard (d.1907). In 1918, he married Helena Blanche Paget, the daughter of the late Commander Webb, R.N. He was educated at Brasenose College, Oxford, won the Donald E. Bridgman Essay Prize, and graduated with honours in Literae Humaniores.

References

External links

W.G. Howard Gritten in Debrett's House of Commons, 1922

1870 births
1943 deaths
Conservative Party (UK) MPs for English constituencies
UK MPs 1918–1922
UK MPs 1929–1931
UK MPs 1931–1935
UK MPs 1935–1945
People from Westminster
Alumni of Brasenose College, Oxford
Fellows of the Royal Geographical Society